José Paulo Bisol (22 October 1928 – 26 June 2021) was a Brazilian politician and judge. Bisol most notably served as the vice presidential running mate of Luiz Inácio Lula da Silva, known as Lula, in the 1989 presidential election. Bisol was originally set to serve as Lula's running mate in the 1994 presidential election, but was replaced by Aloízio Mercadante. Bisol was famous for being an opponent of corruption, and was said to have had a "Mr. Clean" image that was damaged by accusations surrounding his career as a judge during the 1994 campaign.

Career 
Throughout his career, Bisol served as a member of the Brazilian Democratic Movement (MDB), the Brazilian Socialist Party (PSB), and the Workers' Party, which he remained a member of. Born in Porto Alegre, Bisol served in a variety of positions representing his home state of Rio Grande do Sul, including as a member of the Senate and the Chamber of Deputies. Additionally, Bisol served as state Secretary of Justice and Security of Rio Grande do Sul.

Later in his career, Bisol emerged as a critic of Lula, accusing him of being a neoliberal. Additionally, Bisol was outspoken against the centre-right presidency of Michel Temer. Bisol was a graduate of the Pontifical Catholic University of Rio Grande do Sul, where he studied law.

Personal life 
Bisol suffered from kidney problems, having to endure hemodialysis sessions three times a week as of 2018. He was the brother of prominent Brazilian linguist Leda Bisol, who is primarily known for his contribution to the phonology of Brazilian Portuguese.

Death 
Bisol died on 26 June 2021, in Porto Alegre.

References 

1928 births
2021 deaths
People from Porto Alegre
20th-century Brazilian judges
Members of the Federal Senate (Brazil)
Members of the Chamber of Deputies (Brazil) from Rio Grande do Sul
Brazilian Democratic Movement politicians
Brazilian Socialist Party politicians
Workers' Party (Brazil) politicians
Pontifical Catholic University of Rio Grande do Sul alumni
Candidates for Vice President of Brazil